Milorad Milutinović (10 March 1935 – 12 July 2015) was a Serbian football player and manager.

Career
Like his two brothers Miloš and Bora, Milorad played with Partizan Belgrade as defender in the 1950s and 1960s, playing a total of 194 games and scoring 9 goals. With Belgrade, he won the Yugoslav First League three times: in 1960-61, 1961-62 and 1962-63.

He was part of the Yugoslav squad at the 1958 FIFA World Cup, but did not play, and ended his career with no national team caps.

After ending his playing career, he became a football manager. He was the manager of Neuchâtel Xamax between 1968 and 1969.

References
 Profile at FIFA.com
 Switzerland - Trainers of First and Second Division Clubs at RSSSF
 Stats from Partizan at clubs official site

1935 births
2015 deaths
Serbian footballers
Yugoslav footballers
Yugoslav First League players
FK Partizan players
OFK Beograd players
FK Bor players
FC La Chaux-de-Fonds players
Yugoslav expatriate footballers
Serbian expatriate footballers
Expatriate footballers in Switzerland
1958 FIFA World Cup players
Association football defenders
Serbian football managers
Yugoslav football managers
Neuchâtel Xamax FCS managers
Expatriate football managers in Switzerland
People from Bajina Bašta